The International Fundraising Consultancy. is a global management, communication and fundraising consultancy for civil society, with offices in London,  Geneva, Milan, Amsterdam, Kiev, Singapore, Lima and New York.

History
International Fundraising Consultancy was the brainchild of John Baguley, Jasvir Kaur  and Chris Small, who wanted to use their fundraising and management skills to help civil society. It was registered as a company in 2000 with equal share ownership. Small has since left the International Fundraising Consultancy, leaving Baguley and Kaur as co-owners and directors.

Today, John Baguley remains as Chair of the Board. Bill King is now the Chief Executive Officer with Helen Ives-Rose the Finance and IT Director.
Internationally IFC has expanded from the UK to open offices around the world including the US, Canada, Netherlands, Italy, Switzerland, Ukraine, Kyrgyzstan, India, Singapore, Peru, Kenya and Tanzania.

Activity
In addition to its fundraising and management services, the International Fundraising Consultancy runs free monthly advice sessions for not-for-profit organisations called Friday Fundraisers. These take place in London, Milan, Kiev, Geneva and Amsterdam.  IFC has also supported fundraising innovation, helping Barnet and Southgate College to open a centre dedicated to learners with learning difficulties and disabilities.

In 2016 it began its Top Table free business breakfast service, bringing together Fundraising Directors, bi-monthly, to discuss issues and trends in fundraising. This is now based in the Chivas Regal room in the London’s Gherkin Tower.

In 2017 it began Fundraising TV on YouTube. This is a series of interviews and talks on current fundraising issues in a magazine format.

IFC has also supported fundraising innovation, for example helping Barnet and Southgate College to open a centre dedicated to learners with learning difficulties and disabilities.

IFC helped the Black Cultural Archives to complete their capital appeal to establish their first centre in Windrush Square, London.

In 2016 IFC also helped the National Army Museum to complete its capital appeal to completely renovate its museum in Chelsea.

IFC is known amongst its peers for providing expertise and knowledge in all areas of fundraising, including viral fundraising, corporate fundraising and the ethics behind it, and capital appeals.

In 2016 John Baguley was awarded a Lifetime Contribution Award from the Institute of Fundraising

Awards
 Charity Times Awards 2017 - Shortlisted in the Advisory Provider of the Year category.
 Nominated for ‘Advisory Provider of the Year’ Charity Times 2016.
 Charity Times Awards - Consultancy of the Year 2015 
 Institute of Fundraising – Best Strategic/Fundraising Consultancy 2014: Winner
Institute of Fundraising - Best Strategic/Fundraising Consultancy 2013: Winner
 Institute of Fundraising Awards 2015- Shortlisted in the 'Best Strategic/Fundraising Consultancy' category.

Publications
Baguley, J. (2001) Successful Fundraising. A fundraising handbook for NGOs published by Bibliotek Books in 1996, and an Open University recommended text. Revised and updated for the second edition in 2001. It is also published in Russian.
Mordaunt, J & Paton, R, Eds (2006) Thoughtful Fundraising.  Two chapters commissioned from J Baguley: Know Your Donors & Fundraising Campaigns
Baguley, J. (2006) Choosing & Using Consultants. Published by Wiremill Publications.
Baguley, J. (2006) Direct Mail Fundraising. Published by Wiremill Publications.
Baguley, J. (2009) The Globalisation of Non-Governmental Organisations: Drivers and Stages. Published by VDM Verlag
Baguley, J. (2014) My Generation: Why Age Affects Everything
Baguley, J. (2015) Successful Capital Appeals: How Boomers Changed the Rules
Baguley, J. (2016) Successful Major Donor Fundraising: How Boomers Changed the Rules
Baguley, J. (2017) Fundraising and Zombies: A Guide to Charity Management. Published by Matador

References

External links
International Fundraising Consultancy website
Wikifund page

Companies based in the City and District of St Albans